Ketty or Ketti is a feminine given name. The name may refer to:

People

First name
Ketty Diridaoua (1921–1996), Greek actress
Ketti Frings (1909–1981), American writer
Ketty Galanta (born 1890s), Russian dancer, a member of the Ballets Russes
Ketti Gallian (1912–1972), French actress
Ketty Gilsoul-Hoppe (1868–1939), Belgian painter
Ketty La Rocca (1938–1976), Italian artist 
Ketty Lester (born 1934), American singer and actress
Ketty Lollia (born 1975), French writer and speaker (dutch, french, english)
Ketty Mathé (born 1988), French judoka

Surname
Rina Ketty (1911–1996), Italian singer

See also
Ketti, a town in Tamil Nadu, India
Katie
Kitty (given name)